Vaccinioideae is a flowering-plant subfamily in the family Ericaceae. It contains the commercially important cranberry, blueberry, bilberry, lingonberry, and huckleberry.

Taxonomy
 Tribe: Andromedeae
 Genera: Andromeda - Zenobia
 Tribe: Gaultherieae
 Genera: Chamaedaphne - Diplycosia - Gaultheria - Leucothoe - Pernettya - Tepuia Tribe: Lyonieae
 Genera: Agarista - Craibiodendron - Lyonia - Pieris Tribe: Oxydendreae
 Genera: Oxydendrum Tribe: Vaccinieae
 Genera: Agapetes - Anthopteropsis - Anthopterus - Cavendishia - Ceratostema - Costera - Demosthenesia - Didonica - Dimorphanthera - Diogenesia - Disterigma - Gaylussacia - Gonocalyx - Macleania - Mycerinus - Notopora - Oreanthes - Orthaea - Pellegrinia -  Periclesia - Plutarchia - Polyclita - Psammisia - Rusbya - Satyria - Semiramisia - Siphonandra - Sphyrospermum -Themistoclesia - Thibaudia - Utleya - Vaccinium''

References

External links
 

 
Asterid subfamilies